Utah State Route 15 may refer to:

 Utah State Route 15, the legislative overlay designation for Interstate (I-15) within Utah, United States, that runs from Arizona to Idaho (through Washington, Iron, Beaver, Millard, Juab, Utah, Salt Lake, Davis, Weber, and Box Elder counties)
 By Utah State law, I-15 within the state has been defined as "State Route 15" since 1977)
 Utah State Route 15 (1912-1977), the former state highway designation for what is currently Utah State Route 9 in Washington and Kane counties in southern Utah, United States, that connects Interstate 15 in Washington with U.S. Route 89 in Mount Carmel Junction

See also

 List of state highways in Utah
 List of Interstate Highways in Utah
 List of highways numbered 15

External links

 Utah Department of Transportation Highway Resolutions: Route 15 (PDF)